The Saudi Industrial Development Fund (SIDF) is a financial wing of the Saudi Arabian government established in 1974. The SIDF was established to provide mid-term and long-term loans to the private industrial sector. It is currently led by the Chief Executive Officer, Dr. Ibrahim Almojel. In 2018, the fund had appropriations of more than $2.4 billion, which has led to the establishment of 108 industrial projects. Previously, SIDF used to finance only local manufacturing businesses. However, 2019, SIDF has started to finance energy, logistics and mining projects in Saudi Arabia.

SIDF and Vision 2030 
SIDF exerts all efforts to maintain its pioneering role in the development of the local industrial sector and keep abreast with the latest developments. Saudi Vision 2030, It attains this goal by pushing for integration with government entities,  I and expands the reach of its support to cover a number of promising sectors in the areas of industry, energy, mining, and logistics.

References 

Organizations established in 1974
Organisations based in Riyadh
Government of Saudi Arabia